TCUSD may refer to:
 Temple City Unified School District
 Tuba City Unified School District